The 1976 NAIA World Series was the 20th annual tournament hosted by the National Association of Intercollegiate Athletics to determine the national champion of baseball among its member colleges and universities in the United States and Canada.

The tournament was again played at Phil Welch Stadium in St. Joseph, Missouri.

Two-time defending champions Lewis (IL) (47–15) defeated Lewis–Clark State (48–11) in a single-game championship series, 16–8, to win the Flyers' third NAIA World Series.

Lewis outfielder Ken Jones was named tournament MVP.

Bracket

See also
 1976 NCAA Division I baseball tournament
 1976 NCAA Division II baseball tournament
 1976 NCAA Division III baseball tournament (inaugural edition)

Reference

|NAIA World Series
NAIA World Series
NAIA World Series
NAIA World Series